Clare is an unincorporated community in DeKalb County, Illinois, United States, located northwest of Sycamore. Clare has a post office with ZIP code 60111.

Notable people
 J. Bradley Burzynski, former state senator

References

Unincorporated communities in DeKalb County, Illinois
Unincorporated communities in Illinois